Daniel Rowe (born 24 October 1995) is an English semi-professional footballer who plays as a defender or midfielder for  club Frickley Athletic.

Career

Rotherham United
Rowe was born in Middlesbrough, North Yorkshire. He began his career with Rotherham United after leaving Darlington. He made his first-team debut on 8 October 2013 as an 87th-minute substitute in a 3–0 win over York City in the Football League Trophy.

Rowe joined Conference North club Stalybridge Celtic on 7 March 2014 on a work-experience loan. On 27 March 2014, he joined League Two club Wycombe Wanderers on loan until the end of the 2013–14 season. Rowe made his debut two days later, starting in a 0–0 draw away to Scunthorpe United. At the end of the 2013–14 season, he was offered a new contract at Rotherham.

On 31 July 2014, Rowe re-joined Wycombe on loan for three months, along with Rotherham teammate Nicky Walker. After making nine appearances, Rowe was recalled by Rotherham on 27 September 2014. On 18 October 2014, Rowe re-joined Wycombe on loan. After making 16 appearances, Rowe's loan with Wycombe was extended until the end of the 2014–15 season. He was recalled by Rotherham on 2 April 2015.

Wycombe Wanderers
Rowe signed for Wycombe permanently on 30 June 2015 on a three-year contract. He scored his first goal for Wycombe with a close-range shot in the 82nd minute of a 3–2 defeat at home to Northampton Town on 3 October 2015.

Rowe joined National League club Barrow on 18 February 2016 on a one-month loan, having not played for Wycombe since December 2015. He made three appearances for Barrow. On 6 January 2017, Rowe rejoined Barrow on loan until the end of the 2016–17 season.

Non-League
On 27 October 2017, Rowe signed for National League North club York City on a contract until June 2019, two days after leaving Wycombe by mutual consent due to personal reasons. He made 12 appearances and scored one goal as York finished 2017–18 in 11th place in the table. He left at the end of the season after an agreement was reached over the remaining year of his contract.

Rowe signed for Northern Premier League Division One East club Frickley Athletic on 18 May 2018.

Career statistics

References

External links
Daniel Rowe profile at the Frickley Athletic F.C. website

1995 births
Living people
Footballers from Middlesbrough
English footballers
Association football defenders
Association football midfielders
Darlington F.C. players
Rotherham United F.C. players
Stalybridge Celtic F.C. players
Wycombe Wanderers F.C. players
Barrow A.F.C. players
York City F.C. players
Frickley Athletic F.C. players
National League (English football) players
English Football League players
Northern Premier League players